Chawama is a constituency of the National Assembly of Zambia. It covers the south-west of Lusaka in Lusaka District, including the suburb of Chawama.

List of MPs

References

Constituencies of the National Assembly of Zambia
1991 establishments in Zambia
Constituencies established in 1991